Sobranie (Cyrillic: Собрание) is a word in several Slavic languages for parliament, and can refer to:

Assembly of the Republic of North Macedonia
National Assembly of Bulgaria
Federal Assembly of Russia
Russian Constituent Assembly, which governed Russia briefly in 1918
Sobranie, a brand of cigarettes